Llewelyn Lewellin (3 August 1798 – 25 November 1878) was a cleric and academic, the first principal of St David's College, Lampeter and the first Dean of St David's.

Lewellin was born at Tremains, Coity, near Bridgend, Glamorgan, the third son of Richard and Maria Lewellin. He was educated at Cowbridge Grammar School and Jesus College, Oxford, graduating with a BA in 1822, an MA in 1824, a BCL in 1827 and a DCL in 1829. Whilst studying at Oxford, he was ordained deacon in 1822 and priest in 1823 by the bishop of Oxford. Lewellin was, in 1826, offered, and accepted, the headmastership of Bruton Grammar School, Somerset. Instead of taking this up, however, he went to Saint David's College (now the University of Wales, Trinity Saint David), as its first principal in 1827.  His initial appointments were as professor of Greek and senior professor of Theology, as well as that of Principal.  He remained as principal until his death, two days after giving a lecture in Greek. He was buried in the churchyard of St Peter's church, Lampeter. Lewellin was active in wider Lampeter life; he was vicar of Lampeter and served on the magistrates' bench at nearby Aberaeron.  In 1840, he became Dean of St David's Cathedral, living at St David's during college vacations.

References

People associated with the University of Wales, Lampeter
Welsh scholars and academics
Alumni of Jesus College, Oxford
1798 births
1878 deaths
Principals of St David's College